Brodosplit is the largest shipyard in Croatia, located in the Supaval bay, on the north side of the Split peninsula.

History

The company was founded in 1922 by a merger of shipyards in the area and has been in its current location since 1932. With significant development in the latter half of the 20th century, it has grown into one of Croatia's largest shipyards. When Croatia was a part of Socialist Yugoslavia, the Yugoslav Navy's submarines designed by Zagreb's Brodarski Institute were built in this shipyard, which was called Brodogradilište specijalnih objekata (Special objects' shipyard.)

After the breakup of Yugoslavia, Brodosplit became a joint stock company, with the Government of Croatia as the majority holder. It employed nearly 4,000 people and had experience in designing and building a wide range of ships for an international market, diesel engines licensed by B&W (MAN) engine.

In 2013, it was privatised and acquired by the Croatian manufacturing company DIV, pending a major restructuring and optimization. The number of workers was cut down to about 2,300.

Ships built

Brodosplit can build and launch ships of 280 metre length and 166,000 DWT in one piece.  To date, they have delivered about 350 vessels, with a total deadweight of over 9 million tons, including many tankers, both panamax and non-panamax, as well as container ships, bulk carriers, dredgers, and passenger ships.
80% of the ships built are exported to foreign contractors from numerous countries, like England, France, Finland, Norway, Sweden, Poland, Germany, Switzerland, Greece, Russia, India, Liberia, Nigeria, Pakistan, Mexico, Argentina, Brazil, Venezuela and the USA.

The  special division is responsible for the construction of numerous advanced vessels. These include warships - frigates, patrol boats, landing craft, submarines etc. for the Ex-Yugoslav Navy, as well as the current Croatian Navy. BSO also constructed offshore platforms, luxury yachts, small cruise ships, catamarans, medium-size ferries like MV Jadran for Jadrolinija, as well as some specialised ships like the Bios Dva research vessel, launched in 2009.

From 1988 to 1994 Brodosplit built four large 34,384 GT ferries for different contractors, with SF-Line being the biggest one. They were named MS Amorella, MS Isabella, MS Frans Suell and MS Thomas Mann. These vessels collected numerous "ship of the year" awards.

A recent innovation is two tankers for Greek clients, a combination between tanker and ro-ro ship. They can transport the oil products from the mainland to Greek islands, and transport the trucks to continue distribution across the islands.

Yard number 469 is a 189-metre-long juice tanker, specialised for transportation of 32,000,000 litres of fresh orange juice in fourteen specially made, sterilised and refrigerated tanks. These types of highly sophisticated tankers are made only in Croatia and Norway.

Yard number 468, due for delivery to a French client SNCM in 2011, is a 41,300GT, 180-metre-long Ro-Pax vessel with twelve decks, for 750 passengers, with 2,500 lane metres for vehicles and a helipad on the top deck. With the selling price of over $150 million, it is the most expensive ship ever built in Croatia.

In 2013 Brodosplit has built two large heavy lift ships for Jumbo Shipping, the largest of their kind. Laying 152 meters long, and 27 meters wide, these have a deadweight of 14,000 tonnes. On their deck they sport two large Huisman cranes, each with a lifting capacity of 1,500 tonnes, bringing the total lifting capacity of the vessel to a record-breaking 3,000 tonnes.

In 2018 Brodosplit has built Flying Clipper, a steel-hulled five-masted fully rigged tall ship which is intended to be used as a cruise ship. A luxury vessel was designed by Polish naval architect Zygmunt Choreń, and initially acquired by Star Clippers Ltd. of Sweden. She is the largest sailing ship ever launched. Her design was based on France II, a famous French five-mast cargo windjammer built in 1911.

References

External links 
 

Vehicle manufacturing companies established in 1922
Shipbuilding companies of Croatia
Diesel engine manufacturers
Marine engine manufacturers
Defence companies of Croatia
Military vehicle manufacturers
1922 establishments in Croatia
Croatian brands
Companies based in Split, Croatia
Engine manufacturers of Croatia